Thonac is a commune in the Dordogne department in Nouvelle-Aquitaine in southwestern France. The area is notable for the Château de Losse and the cemetery contains the grave of Vietnamese Emperor Hàm Nghi.

Population

See also
Communes of the Dordogne department

References

Communes of Dordogne